Rubber fetishism, or latex fetishism, is the fetishistic attraction to people wearing latex clothing or, in certain cases, to the garments themselves. PVC fetishism is closely related to rubber fetishism, with the former referring to shiny clothes made of the synthetic plastic polyvinyl chloride (PVC) and the latter referring to clothes made of rubber, which is generally thicker, less shiny, and more matte than latex. PVC is sometimes confused with the similarly shiny patent leather, which is also a fetish material. Latex or rubber fetishists sometimes refer to themselves as "rubberists". Gay male rubberists tend to call themselves "rubbermen".

The terms "PVC", "vinyl" and "PU" tend to be used interchangeably by retailers for clothing made from shiny plastic-coated fabrics. These fabrics usually consist of a backing woven from polyester fibers with a surface coating of shiny plastic. The plastic layer itself is typically a blend of PVC and polyurethane (PU), with 100% PVC producing a stiff fabric with a glossy shine and 100% PU producing a stretchy fabric with a silky shine. A manufacturer's label may say, for example, 67% polyester, 33% polyurethane for a fabric that contains no PVC; or 80% polyvinyl chloride, 20% polyurethane with mention of the polyester backing omitted. The plastic layer is often textured to look like leather ("leatherlook", "pleather"), as opposed to smooth ("wetlook", "patent").

Motives

One reason why latex or other tight shiny fabrics may be fetishised is perhaps that the garment forms a "second skin" that acts as a fetishistic surrogate for the wearer's own skin. Thus, wearers of skin-tight latex or PVC garments may be perceived by the viewer as being naked, or simply coated in a shiny substance like paint. Latex and PVC can also be polished to be shiny and can also be produced in bright colours, adding further visual stimulus to add to the physical sensations produced by the material. The tightness of the garments may also be viewed as a kind of sexual bondage. The smell of latex rubber is also a turn-on for some rubber fetishists, and such garments are usually impregnated with chemicals to enhance the odour. (Further elaboration needed). Some rubberists also enjoy the idea of exhibitionism and some fantasise about going out in public wearing fetish attire. Some do this, especially in the more liberal areas (e.g., Berlin, New York, Montreal, San Francisco).

A compelling reason that people are turned on by wearing rubber is its transformative abilities. As with any costume, a rubberist can imagine themselves having a new identity, especially one that permits a different code of behavior.

Practices

Latex fetishism sometimes involves dressing up in the material; looking at it worn by sexual partners; or fantasies sometimes wearers of skin-tight or other latex garments, such as divers and workers wearing industrial protective clothing. Another common stereotype is of the image of a dominatrix wearing a skin-tight, usually jet-black, latex or PVC catsuit.

Some latex enthusiasts are also turned on by the wearing of draped latex garments such as cloaks. Other rubber paraphernalia, such as wet suits, gas masks, splash suits, Mackintoshes, galoshes, Wellington boots, rubber/plastic pants, and diapers are also often added to the scenario. Heavier fetishists often attempt duplicating all kinds of "everyday wear" into a rubber counterpart. Some PVC enthusiasts are turned on by PVC hazmat suits and other forms of industrial protective clothing.

For hygienic reasons, many sex toys such as dildos and butt plugs are made from rubber or similar materials, and this is also a factor in rubber fetishism. Some rubber fetishists are also medical fetishists or have an interest in klismaphilia; medical gloves and catheters are made from latex, as are condoms.

A substantial industry exists to produce specialist latex or rubber fetish clothing garments for rubber enthusiasts.

Many latex or rubber clothes appear on websites such as eBay, and in recent years clothes made in PVC have been prevalent in young people's fashions, particularly in jackets, skirts and trousers. Several mainstream designers have made latex clothing. As fashions come round and round again, it would seem that PVC, latex and similar materials are appearing again in mainstream street fashions as well as continuing to be central to the fetish scene.

A number of fetish magazines have been published on the subject of rubber and PVC fetishism, including AtomAge, Dressing for Pleasure, Marquis, «O», Shiny International, and Skin Two.

Latex look-alike materials
PVC/vinyl and metal are two other shiny materials used for clothing from regular street wear (raincoats) to PVC hazmat suits and other forms of industrial protective clothing. As with latex, these materials became more noted as fetish material in the 1960s and early 1970s. During that era, boots and garments made of PVC and vinyl were made and worn in public areas to some degrees. British TV programme The Avengers showcased this.

Numerous underground fetish production houses were started, which published magazines such as "Shiny", "Shiny's International", "Rubberist", "Dressing for Pleasure" (both of these publications later merged with each other), noted rubber fetish author Helen Henley and others of this time frame.

Fashion designers such as Jean Paul Gaultier, Yves Saint Laurent, Pierre Cardin and André Courrèges have used PVC in their collections. Since 2010, the PVC has been the target of fashion not only for the female public but also to the male public.

Clear Plastic Clothing
There are those who love to make and wear clear plastic clothing; rancoats, rain capes, and clear haz mat suits. Some people love to wear clear raincoats in public while other like to wear clear plastic clothing at fetish parties. An example of a fashion house is PVC U Like (https://pvc-u-like.com/).

In popular culture
 In the film Scooby-Doo 2: Monsters Unleashed, Velma wears an orange PVC outfit to look attractive, although she is uncomfortable in it.
 In the Batman film series, Batman's costume is of rubber; in Batman Returns, Catwoman wears a rubber catsuit.
 The artwork of Allen Jones has been strongly influenced by the imagery of rubber fetishism and BDSM.
 In a scene from the film Two for the Road (1967), the actress Audrey Hepburn appears wearing a shiny black PVC trouser suit designed by Michele Rosier.
 In an episode of the American television sitcom The Nanny, Fran Drescher wore a red PVC outfit.
 In the music video for "Scream" (1995), Michael Jackson and his sister Janet Jackson wore black PVC pants.
The English television and radio personality Zoë Ball wore black PVC pants in one of her appearances on the English TV program Shooting Stars.
 In 101 Dalmatians and 102 Dalmatians, Cruella (played by Glenn Close) wears red pvc thigh high boots (which get covered in molasses and mud) and black pvc crotch boots, and a black pvc belt (which get covered in sugar, eggs, milk and battered into a cake) respectively.
 In certain episodes of the American television series Smallville, the actress Erica Durance appears wearing PVC clothes.
 In 2007, the Brazilian singer Ivete Sangalo wore a black PVC outfit in her show Multishow ao Vivo: Ivete no Maracanã.
 In recent years, latex and PVC have appeared in the media, in TV series like Alias; in music videos by pop stars like Britney Spears, Lady Gaga, and Thalía; and even in fashion trends.
 In Secret Diary of a Call Girl (2007), a British drama television series, Gemma Chan was playing Billie Piper's rival in Secret Diary of a Call Girl, Gemma wore latex get-ups to transform into her role of Charlotte, the feisty dominatrix.
 During New York Fashion Week 2022, fashion house Balenciaga featured models wearing latex suits and hoods underneath their clothing.
 The series American Horror Story features "Rubber Man", a character in a bondage suit.

See also
Catsuits and bodysuits in popular media
Fetish fashion
PVC clothing
Dry suit
Leather fetishism
Neoprene
Sexual fetishism
Spandex fetishism
Total enclosure fetishism
Wetsuit
Balloon fetish

References

External links 
 Latex Wiki Latex Community Wiki hosted by Lust, Love, Latex
 The International Association of |R|ubberists (I.A.R.)Latex and rubber fetish support group

Sexual fetishism
BDSM
Fetish clothing